Didier Florent Ouénangaré (1953–2006) was a film director from the Central African Republic, best known for his collaboration with Cameroonian filmmaker Bassek Ba Kobhio on The Silence of the Forest, an adaptation of a novel by Étienne Goyémidé.

Life
Ouénangaré was born in Bambari. After studying film in Abidjan in the Ivory Coast, he graduated from the University of Rennes.

The Silence of the Forest was a project conceived by Ouénangaré, who approached Bassek Ba Kobhio to help find financing. It was written in French and Sango, and filmed in Central African Republic and Gabon. It tells the story of Gonaba, an African educated in Europe, who decides to return to his homeland, but increasingly realises the impossibility of breaking through stereotypes and genuinely understanding the way of life of the Baka people, the 'people of the forest' whom he pejoratively labels 'pygmies'.

Ouénangaré died on 29 September 2006.

Filmography
 Le silence de la forêt [The Silence of the Forest], 2003

References

1953 births
2006 deaths
Central African Republic film directors
People from Ouaka
University of Rennes alumni